Jan Batory (23 August 1921 - 1 August 1981) was a Polish film director and screenwriter.

Selected filmography

References

External links
 

1921 births
1981 deaths
People from Kalisz
Polish film directors
20th-century Polish screenwriters
Male screenwriters
20th-century Polish male writers